The NOS Energy Drink Knoxville Nationals is an annual sprint car event held at Knoxville Raceway in Knoxville, Iowa. An Associated Press writer called winning the event "sprint car racing’s premiere title". It is nicknamed "The Granddaddy of Them All."  The event is the biggest and most prestigious race of the year in sprint car racing. The Saturday finale is held on the second Saturday in August.  The event is held for four days (Wednesday-Saturday) and is attended annually by approximately 25,000 fans.  The event has the highest paying purse in sprint car racing at $1,000,000 which attracts roughly 100 race teams to compete.

History
The idea of the Knoxville Nationals was the brainchild of promoter Marion Robinson. The Knoxville Nationals began as a one-day event for Super Modifieds and was later expanded to two, three, and finally four days of racing for Sprint Cars. The first Knoxville Nationals was held in 1961 with Roy Robbins taking the win.

The prize money for the event has grown over the years. The 1961 winner received $1,000 to win and the total purse was $5,455. In 1971 it was $3,000 to win and a total of $22,000.  1982 was $10,000 to win and $100,500. 1991 the winner received $50,000 and the total was $300,120.  1995 it grew to $100,000 to win and $501,000 over all; by 2003 it had risen to $750,000.  The purse continued to swell each year and in 2010 it paid $150,000 to win and the total for four days reached $1,000,255.

Some of the events highlights are its surprise upset winners, most notably being Kenny Gritz in 1969, Bobby Allen in 1990, Tim Shaffer in 2010, and Jason Johnson in 2016.

The 1990 Nationals is regarded as one of the best of all time as Doug Wolfgang, off a poor performance in his qualifying day, was sent to the D Main (one of the lowest levels on Finals Saturday) and advanced through the "alphabet soup" of the D-Main, C-Main, B-Main, and finished fifth in the A-Main.  Meanwhile, Mark Kinser led the first 22 laps before his engine expired setting up an epic shootout between Sammy Swindell and Bobby Allen, with Allen winning with a pass with two laps remaining. The 1991 event featured 170 entrants and 75000 fans (in a city of 8200). There were drivers from 27 states, 6 from Australia, and one from Canada.

The 2010 Nationals in its 50th anniversary was also one of the most popular years with the first 50 lap championship feature in which Sammy Swindell led the first 46 laps before his left rear tire blew up. This handed the lead to Donny Schatz who had engine problems and Tim Shaffer was able to lead the final two circuits to get the win.

In 1969 Kenny Gritz won the Nationals, passing Jan Opperman with four laps remaining. Gritz was fairly new to super modified racing, only competing for four or five seasons.  He had won only one feature at Knoxville a couple of months prior and was beginning to peak as a driver.  Unfortunately Gritz lost his life two weeks later in a crash at the Nebraska State Fair where IMCA rules at the time did not allow roll cages.  His accident sparked the rule change in which roll cages were mandated after that.

Drivers
The most successful driver in Nationals history is Steve Kinser who has won the event a record 12 times. He leads virtually every major statistic, 17 top five finishes, 26 top ten finishes, won 14 preliminary night features, led 301 championship A-Main laps, set quick time in qualifying 9 times, qualified for the championship race 35 times in 37 entries, including a streak of 34 from 1978 through 2011. In 2005 Steve's son Kraig Kinser won this event, making Steve and Kraig the first father and son to win the Knoxville Nationals.

Donny Schatz has won the event eleven times (2006-2009, 2011–2015, 2017, 2022).  Other multiple event winners are Doug Wolfgang a five-time champion, Kenny Weld and Danny Lasoski four-time winners, Mark Kinser three time champ, and Eddie Leavitt has taken the checkers twice.

Statistics
The event record car count is 166 cars in 1991. Mark Kinser has set the quickest time in qualifying a record ten times.  Cody Darrah holds the Nationals event one lap track record with a lap 14.547 in 2009.

Donny Schatz won the championship race in 2013 from 21st starting position, the lowest starting position for a winner.  The previous record for the lowest position anyone had won from had been 14th by Steve Kinser in 1995 and Jerry Richert 1962.

Car owner Karl Kinser has graced victory lane a record 14 times with three different drivers (Dick Gaines, Steve Kinser and Mark Kinser).

Sanctioning body
From 1961 through 1977, the race was unsanctioned (with the exception of 1973) meaning that it was 'open competition'.  The All Star Circuit of Champions sanctioned the 1973 event with winged cars. In 1978 Ted Johnson's World of Outlaws began to sanction the event, and did so through 2005. Because of the sanctioning body split between the WoO and National Sprint Tour in 2006, the Nationals became sanctioned under the Knoxville Raceway track rules. Since 2012 the WoO name has been associated with the race, but the event is still operated by Knoxville Raceway officials.

Female participants
15 women have participated in the Nationals. Erin Crocker is the only participant to qualify for the championship race and has accomplished that feat twice in 2003 and 2010.  The first female entrant was also the first African-American driver, Cheryl Glass in 1982.  Other female entrants include Melinda Dumesny (part of both the Nationals-winning Kinser and Dumesny sprint car families) 1991–1992, Lisa French 1992–1993, Shawna Wilsky 1994–1995, Judi Bates 1996–1997, Sarah Fisher 1997–1998, Christi Passmore 2000–2001, Natalie Sather 2005–2006, Becca Anderson 2006, Jessica Friesen (née Zemken) 2006 & 2011, Paige Polyak 2014–2019, Harli White 2017–2019 & 2021, Jenna Frazier 2018, McKenna Haase 2021, and Tori Knutson 2021.

International competition
In 1979, multiple Australian Sprintcar Champion Garry Rush became the first Australian driver to qualify for the Nationals championship race and finished 7th. Kerry Madsen is the highest finishing Australian, finishing second in 2015 (although he is now legally registered as a local resident).  The event is annually attended by over 1,000 people from Australia, Canada, New Zealand, and England. 

Drivers from Australia who have become or were regular competitors at Knoxville include Australian Championship winners Garry Rush, Max Dumesny who won the 1985 Race of States at the Nationals, becoming the first Australian to win a feature at Knoxville. Others have included Skip Jackson, Jaymie Moyle, Kerry Madsen, Ian Madsen, Garry Brazier, Trevor Green, Mitchell Dumesny, Jamie Veal, James McFadden and current one lap track record holder Brooke Tatnell.  In 2018, former World Champion BriSCA Formula 1 Stock Car driver Tom Harris became the first British driver to compete at the Nationals.

List of Knoxville Nationals winners

Multiple victories by driver

Additional Info
 Steve Kinser and Donny Schatz both hold the record for most consecutive wins at 5.
 Steve Kinser and Kraig Kinser are the only father-son duo to have won the Knoxville Nationals.
 Greg Weld and Kenny Weld are the only brothers that have both won the Knoxville Nationals.

360 Knoxville Nationals
In 1991, the Knoxville Raceway started a Nationals event for 360 cubic inch engine sprint cars. It has been held annually each year since and is held the week before the Knoxville Nationals. Shane Stewart and Terry McCarl hold the record for most wins with five victories each.

360 Knoxville Nationals Champions

Multiple victories by driver

Late Model Knoxville Nationals
In 2004, the Late Model Knoxville Nationals was created and is held annually at the end of September. Scott Bloomquist, Brian Birkhofer, Mike Marlar, and Jimmy Owens are the only repeat champions of the event. In 2021, Mike Marlar became the first three-time winner of the Late Model Knoxville Nationals.

Late Model Knoxville Nationals Champions

Multiple victories by driver

References

External links
Official track website

Dirt track racing in the United States
Auto races in the United States
Motorsport in Iowa
World of Outlaws